The women's 4 × 400 metres relay event at the 2009 Asian Athletics Championships was held at the Guangdong Olympic Stadium on November 14.

Results

References
Results

2009 Asian Athletics Championships
Relays at the Asian Athletics Championships
2009 in women's athletics